Isothetic (from Greek roots: iso- for "equal, same, similar" and  for position, placement) may refer to one of the following.

In computational geometry, see isothetic polygon
 Isothetic polyhedra

In data analysis, isothetic lines, isothetic curves, or simply isothetics are contour lines for a data set, where data represent Displacements